Planá is a municipality and village in České Budějovice District in the South Bohemian Region of the Czech Republic. It has about 300 inhabitants.

Geography
It lies in the České Budějovice Basin. The Vltava river forms its southern and eastern municipal border.

History
The first written mention of Planá is from 1259. Between 1961 and 1990, it was an administrative part of Homole. Since 24 November 1990, it has been a separate municipality.

Transport
Part of České Budějovice Airport is located in the municipal territory.

Notable people
Anton Ortmann (1801–1861), Austrian pharmacist and botanist
Ferdinand Kowarz (1838–1914), Austrian entomologist

References

External links

Villages in České Budějovice District